Monterrey La Raza were a Mexican professional indoor soccer team based in Monterrey, Mexico. Founded in 2007, the team played in the Major Indoor Soccer League.

The team played its home games at Arena Monterrey. The team's colors were orange, black and white. Their last head coach was Mariano Bollella.

History
This version of the Monterrey La Raza indoor soccer team began play in fall 2007 at Arena Monterrey as a member of the Major Indoor Soccer League. On July 17, 2007, the MISL officially announced that La Raza would enter the league for the 2007–08 season.

La Raza played their home games in Arena Monterrey, owned by TV Azteca, the second largest Mexican television network. TV Azteca also owned La Raza.

TV Azteca acquired the rights to the Monterrey La Raza name from the owner of the original CISL/WISL franchise, Pedro Luis Durán.

The team was successful in its lone MISL season, reaching the league's championship game before losing to the Baltimore Blast. When the MISL folded, La Raza announced they would be joining the NISL for its inaugural 2008–09 season. They also announced an exhibition schedule against PASL teams for the 2008–09 season.

Year-by-year

Head coaches
 Erich Geyer (2007–2009)
 Mariano Bollella (2009–2010)

Arenas

Arena Monterrey; Monterrey, Mexico (2007–2010)

References

External links
Official Website

2007 establishments in Mexico
2010 disestablishments in Mexico
Association football clubs established in 2007
Defunct football clubs in Mexico
Football clubs in Monterrey
Major Indoor Soccer League (2001–2008) teams
Major Indoor Soccer League (2008–2014) teams
Mexican indoor football teams
Monterrey La Raza